Kandukur or Kandukuru is a town in SPSR Nellore district of the Indian state of Andhra Pradesh. It is a municipality and the headquarters of Kandukur mandal as well as Kandukur revenue division. Kandukur Mandal is located at the south-east side of the Prakasam District having geographical area around 225 sq km.There is only 1 city in the Kandukur Mandal, which is Kandukur Municipality having an area of 37.63 sq km.

Etymology

History 
Kandukur has a strong historical background and came under the rule of the king Sri Krishna Devaraya. Ankamma Talli Devalayam is the most famous religious attraction in Kandukur and other landmark Hindu temples in the town include Ayyappa Swamy Temple and Shirdi Saibaba Temple. .

Geography 
Kandukur was a part of the erstwhile Nellore district and was then included in the newly carved out Prakasam District in 1970. Later as a part of the district's reorganization in 2022, it is now merged with the residual SPSR Nellore district. The total geographical area of Kandukur Municipality is 37.63 sq km.

Flora and Fauna

Physiographically, most part of the district is a level plain with an average height of 300 meters showing a gradient towards the East (coast). The remaining Western part is however rugged and higher in elevation (up to 1,200 meters) where the Nallamala and Velikonda Hill ranges are the characteristic features of the Landscape. Vegetal cover in the district is characterized by the extensive reserved forest areas (mainly in the Western part) showing dry Teak, Southern dry mixed deciduous and tropical dry evergreen forest types. 
Kandukur Plain: (Area – 1,850 sq km) Occupying the South-Eastern part of the district, the region includes parts of Kandukur and Kondapi. It is mostly plain and is drained by Makeru, Manneru, Upputeru and Atleru rivers which are the main source of irrigation. 
Forests occupy about 25.1% of the total geographical area in the district. 
As regards Fauna, in the olden days, there were large number of elephants and other wild animals. Tigers were so plentiful, that the Collectors were forced to take special steps to keep their population down. When the Census of Tigers was taken in 1978, there were 40 to 43 tigers in the Srisailam – Nagarjunasagar area and this area was found to be congenial for the growth and development of tigers. A scheme ‘Project Tigers’ was launched in 1983 under the name “Nagarjunasagar – Srisailam” with the Wildlife Sanctuary covering an area of 3,568 sq km spread over 5 districts, and one of the districts was Prakasam. The stock of Tigers rose to 97 during 1991 in this sanctuary. The Wildlife Protection Act, brought by the Government of India has provided protection to all wild animals and birds.
Prakasam district has a long coastline of about 102 km in the East and has smaller rivers covering a length of 548 km of running water. There are about 809 big and small tanks in the district. These water sources have abundant deposits of marine and freshwater fishes, agricultural land has been converted into fish ponds (Aquaculture). The Government constituted a Brackish Water Fish Farmers Development Agency for Prakasam District to develop the brackish water areas and adopt improved cultural practices and make the feed and seeds available to progressive farmers. There are two major fish seed rearing farms, one at Darsi and the other at Karamchedu. There are 84 Fishermen Co-operative Societies in the district.

Topography

Kandukur has a general slope. There is a major stream in Kandukur Municipality towards the South Eastern side. The stream is a tributary of Krishna River named Manneru which further flows into the Bay of Bengal.

Demography 
Population Distribution

Kandukur Mandal, is the 4th most populous Mandal in Prakasam.  India census, Prakasam District has a total population of 33,97,448 which is 6.84% of total population of Andhra Pradesh.Out of the total population of Prakasam District, 27,32,866 is in a rural area which is 80.44% of the total district, whereas 6,64,582 is in urban areas, which is 19.56%.
There are a total of 56 Mandal in the Prakasam District. Kandukur Mandal has a total population of 98,769 which is 2.9% of the total district. There is only one urban area in Kandukur Mandal which is Kandukur Municipality. It has a population of 57,246 which is 57.96% of the Kandukur Mandal. The rural population in KandukurMunicipality is 41,523 which is 42.04% of the Kandukur Mandal. Among them, 28,644 (50.04%) are males and 28,602 (49.96%) are females.

Population Growth Rate

Kandukur Municipality is the third largest municipality in Prakasam District and was formed in 1987. population projections, the population trends for the last 3 decades are reviewed and analysed. The population trends and growth rate of the town as per the past trends, it is observed that Kandukur had a population of 32,370 in 1981 which increased to 41,336 with a growth rate of 27.70 in the year 1991. From 1991 to 2001 the population increased from41,336 to 50,336 with a growth rate of 21.75% and from 2001 to 2011 the population increased from 50,336to 57,246 with a growth rate of 13.75%. It can be thus incurred that though the population has increased population growth rate has declined.

Sex Ratio

Kandukur Municipality has a sex ratio of 999, meaning there are 999 females per 1000 males. The sex ratio for Kandukur Mandal is 989 which is less than the Kandukur Municipality. The sex ratio for Prakasam district, Andhra Pradesh state and India are 981, 993 and 943 respectively. Thus, the sex ratio in the Kandukur municipality area is higher than that compared to Mandal, district, state and all over India.

Literacy Rate

Kandukur Municipality has a total literacy rate of 67.31% which is higher than the total literacy rate of Kandukur Mandal and Prakasam District. However, the literacy rate is less than the literacy rate of India. Also, a gap is observed between the male and female literacy rate in Kandukur Municipality. The male literacy rate is 73.75% and the female literacy rate is 61.09%. Thus, the literacy gap between males and females in Kandukur Municipality is 12.44%.

Workers’ Classification

The total workers in Kandukur Municipality are 20,729 which is 36.21% of the total population. Out of the total workers, almost 92% of them are main workers, whereas the marginal workers are 8% of the total workers. 
However, there is a major difference between the worker profiles of male-female workers. Almost 75% of the total workers are male and the remaining 25% are female workers.
However, in marginal workers, almost 55% are female workers, whereas the male marginal workers are 45% of the total marginal workers. 
The occupational pattern as per census 2011 suggests that almost 78% of the total workers are involved in non-primary activities, and only 22% of the total workers are involved in the primary sector.

Governance 

Civic administration

Kandukuru Municipal Council is the seat of the local government which administers Kavali town. Kandhukur is a 2nd-grade municipality and 3rd largest Municipality in the Prakasam district, with 57315 populations with an extent of 60.32 sq km.  It is the Mandal head quarter for the Kandukur Mandal. Kandukur Municipality is divided into 30 wards. Among them, ward no.28 is highly populous with an area of 8.15 sq km.

Infrastructure

Kandukur has a total road network of 410 km out of which, the majority of the roads are Pucca roads. Kandukur has a Summer Storage Tank which has a capacity of 30 million litres. The stored water is then treated and supplied to the Kandukur Municipality. But during the household survey, maximum households complained about the quality of the water. Almost all the houses are covered with electric connections. Kandukur has an open drainage network all across the town. Kandukur does not have a sewerage network.

Planning

The Master Plan for Kandukur was approved vide GO.MS. NO 950 MA, Dated 30/10/2005 with a plan period of 20 years, for an area of 60 sq km. Kandukur is a Municipality Town and also a Mandal Headquarter in Prakasam District which provides it with the opportunity to grow further. Around 60% of the Mandal population resided in the town. The maximum area is Residential and Urbanisable Use. In Kandukur Town, out of the total, around 55% area is open Land, 37% area is Agriculture Land and only 5% area is under Built-up. It will give land availability for future development. The majority of agriculture in Kandukur is for “Jamboil” which is a major component in the production of paper. With upcoming industrial areas in the proximity (Krishnapatnam port and surrounding), there are better scopes for development in terms of Infrastructure as well as employment generation. DT&CP has taken the initiative to prepare a revised Master Plan for the year 2041, for planned development, to encourage existing economic activities to grow by providing adequate infrastructure in terms of the road network and preservation of other natural features. Also, to formulate infrastructure projects addressing the needs of water, solid waste collection, drainage etc.

Economy

Socio-Economic Profile

The total number of Households in Kandukur Municipality as per the 2011 census is 13,934. The average household size in Kandukur Municipality is 3.8 persons per household. The majority of the population in Kandukur Municipality is Hindu which is 315 (67%). Other religions are Muslim and Christian which are 108 (23%) and 50 (10%) respectively. Maximum households are engaged in other daily wage activities. They do not have permanent jobs/ own businesses. Maximum households have monthly income within a range of Rs. 10,001 to Rs. 20,000.

Education 
The primary and secondary school education is imparted by government, aided and private schools, under the School Education Department of the state. There are a total of 26 schools in Kandukur, out of which 19 are private schools and 7 are government. 
schools.

Climate
Temperature

Kandukur is located around 15 to 20 km from the Eastern coast of India, thus has a maritime weather therefore the difference between maximum and minimum temperature is not high. In the past 10 years(2008-2018), minimum observed temperature is 16 °C and the maximum temperature observed is 38 °C. It is observed that March, April and May are the hottest months in a year and November, December and January are the coldest.

Rainfall

Kandukur receives an average amount of rainfall and has received around 867 mm of rainfall in the last 10 years. Major monsoon months are May, June, July, September, and November. However, some showers are also observed during the month of March.

Wind Speed

Kandukur has an average wind speed of 16 km/ hr in a year. However, the lowest wind speed recorded is 10.7 km/ hr in the month of December, whereas the highest wind speed recorded is 30 km/ hr in the month of August. June, July and August have higher wind speeds than compared to the rest of the year. 
The general wind direction in Kandukur is from South-East to North-West and from East-West. However, it is observed that on some days, the wind direction is from North to South.

Humidity

Kandukur being located near the coastal edge has a high humidity rate. The maximum humidity observed is around 80-85%. November has the most humidity, whereas January, February and March have lower humidity level which is around 40-45%.  The yearly average humidity is 61%.

Connectivity 

Kandukur (earlier known as Skandapuri) is located on the Southern side of Vijaywada in Prakasam District. It is connected by State Highway to Kanigiri by SH 35 which connects Kandukur to Kanigiri on the Western side and links to NH16 towards the East. Kandukur is connected by 2 other State Highways which connect Kandukur to Pamur towards the South-West side by Kandukur-Pamur Road and Gudluru and Thettu by Kandukur-Gudluru-Thettu road towards the Southern side.

National Highway 167B, which starts at Mydukuru passes through the town and eventually terminates at National Highway 16 which is part of Golden Quadrilateral highway network on the outskirts of Singarayakonda. APSRTC is a major Bus station in Kandukur.

The nearest Railway Station to Kandukur is Singarayakonda. This Railway Station is classified as a B–category station in the Vijayawada Railway Division of the South Central Railway Zone. Singrayakonda is connected 10 km by road. The nearest railway station is - Markapur - 60 km far by road. Ongole is 80 km and Singarayakonda is 65 km
away from Kandukur. A new Railway Station is coming up in Kanigiri under the new Railway Line project of the Nadikudi–Srikalahasti section.

Vijayawada Airport is the closest airport to Kandukur, around 210 km. Other International Airports nearby airports are Hyderabad, Tirupati and Chennai. All these airports have good connectivity with major Indian cities like Delhi, Mumbai, Kolkata, Banglore and other International Cities. There is a proposal for a Green Field Domestic Airport at Ongole, which is near around 45 km away from Kandukur.

See also 
 List of towns in Andhra Pradesh
 List of municipalities in Andhra Pradesh

References

Villages in Prakasam district
Mandal headquarters in Prakasam district